Tartaric may mean:
 containing tartaric acid or tartrates
 pertaining to Tartary or the Tatars

See also 
 Tartarian (disambiguation)